Flos areste, the tailless plushblue, is a small butterfly found in the Indomalayan region that belongs to the lycaenids or blues family.

Range
The butterfly occurs in India from Sikkim to Assam and the northern and southern Shan states Burma, Thailand to Peninsular Malaya and China (Chekiang, Guangdong).

Status
In 1932, William Harry Evans reported that the species was rare.

Cited references

See also
List of butterflies of India (Lycaenidae)

References
 
 
 
 

Amblypodia
Butterflies of Asia